Mykola is a Slavic variant, more specifically a Ukrainian variant, of the masculine name "Nicholas", meaning "victory of the people". It may refer to:

People 
Mykola Arkas (1853–1909), Ukrainian composer, writer, historian, and cultural activist
Mykola Avilov (born 1948), Ukrainian Soviet decathlete, competed at the 1968, 1972 and 1976 Olympics
Mykola Azarov (born 1947), Ukrainian politician, Prime Minister of Ukraine from 2010 to 2014
Mykola Babak (born 1954) is a Ukrainian artist, writer, publisher, and art collector
Mykola Bahlay (born 1976), Ukrainian football forward
Mykola Bakay (1931–1998), Ukrainian singer, composer, poet, author and Soviet dissident
Mykola Balan, Ukrainian military official, Lieutenant General, a commander of the National Guard of Ukraine
Mykola Bazhan (1904–1983), Soviet Ukrainian writer, poet and politician
Mykola Belokurov (1926–2006), Soviet middle-distance runner
Mykola Berezutskiy (born 1937), Ukrainian hurdler
Mykola Bevz (born 1954), Ukrainian scientist, architect, member of ICOMOS
Mykola Biliashivsky (1867–1926), Ukrainian archaeologist, ethnographer, art historian
Mykola Bilokon (born 1955), Ukrainian politician, Minister of Internal Affairs of Ukraine (2003–2005)
Mykola Bohuslavsky (1850–1933), organiser & sponsor of the kobzar renaissance in the Kuban, a community leader, publisher
Mykola Bondar (1990–2020), Ukrainian competitive figure skater
Mykola Budnyk, luthier and traditional performer in the Kobzar tradition
Mykola Burachek (1871–1942), Ukrainian Impressionist painter and pedagogue
Mykola Butsenko (born 1991), Ukrainian amateur boxer
Mykola Buy (born 1996), professional Ukrainian football midfielder
Mykola Chaban, Soviet and Ukrainian journalist, Ukrainian prose writer, specialist in Dnipropetrovsk region
Mykola Chupryna (born 1962), Ukrainian rower
Mykola Dementiuk (born 1949), American author
Mykola Dibrova, Ukrainian Paralympic athlete with cerebral palsy
Mykola Dmitrishin (born 1990), Ukrainian badminton player
Mykola Dovhan (born 1955), Ukrainian Olympic rower
Mykola Dzhyha (born 1949), Ukrainian career militsiya officer and later politician, member of the Verkhovna Rada
Mykola Fedorenko (born 1955), retired Soviet football player, current Ukrainian football coach
Mykola Fomin (born 1909), Soviet football player
Mykola Fominykh (1927–1996), Soviet football coach and football administrator
Mykola Gogol (1809–1852), Ukrainian-born writer who wrote in Russian because the Ukrainian language was banned in the Russian Empire
Mykola Grigoriev (1885–1919), paramilitary leader noted for numerous switching of sides during the civil war in Ukraine
Mykola Hlushchenko (1901–1977), Ukrainian artist
Mykola Hnatyuk (born 1952), Soviet, Ukrainian singer, popular in the early 1980s
Mykola Hobdych (born 1961), Ukrainian choral conductor, founder and director of the Kyiv Chamber Choir
Mykola Holonyak (born 1928), American engineer and educator
Mykola Holovko (1937–2004), Ukrainian football (soccer) player and coach
Mykola Horbal (born 1940), Ukrainian dissident, human right activist, member of parliament of Ukraine
Mykola Hordiychuk (born 1983), Ukrainian weightlifter
Mykola Hrabar, self-nominated candidate in the 2004 Ukrainian presidential election
Mykola Hreshta (born 1984), Ukrainian footballer
Mykola Hrinchenko (born 1986), professional Ukrainian football midfielder
Mykola Hulak (1821–1899), Ukrainian political and cultural activist, journalist, scientist, interpreter, lawyer
Mykola Ischenko (born 1983), Ukrainian footballer
Mykola Ivanovych Tseluiko (1937–2007), Ukrainian painter and textile artist
Mykola Ivasyuk (1865–1937), Ukrainian painter; executed during the Great Purge
Mykola Kanevets, Artistic Director & Ballet Master of the Cheremosh Ukrainian Dance Company in Edmonton, Alberta, Canada
Mykola Kapustiansky (1879–1969), General in the army of the Ukrainian National Republic, founder of the Organization of Ukrainian Nationalists
Mykola Karpov (1929–2003), Ukrainian playwright
Mykola Karpuk (born 1982), Ukrainian bodybuilder and personal trainer
Mykola Karpyuk, Ukrainian political activist, former vice leader of the UNA-UNSO, member of the central council of the Right Sector
Mykola Katerynchuk, Ukrainian politician and lawyer, former member of the Ukrainian parliament
Mykola Khvylovy (1893–1933), Ukrainian writer and poet of the early Communist era Ukrainian Renaissance (1920–1930)
Mykola Kmit (born 1966), Ukrainian politician and the former head of the Lviv Oblast State Administration
Mykola Kniazhytskyi (born 1968), Ukrainian journalist, People's Deputy of Ukraine, Head of the Committee on Culture and Spirituality
Mykola Kolessa (1903–2006), Ukrainian composer and conductor
Mykola Koltsov (1936–2011), Soviet footballer and Ukrainian football children and youth trainer
Mykola Kolumbet (1933–2012), Ukrainian cyclist
Mykola Komarov (born 1961), Ukrainian rower who competed for the Soviet Union in the 1988 Summer Olympics
Mykola Kondratyuk (1931–2006), Soviet and Ukrainian Chamber concert and opera singer (baritone), educator, social activist
Mykola Konrad, Ukrainian Greek Catholic priest who became a martyr in 1941
Mykola Kostyak (born 1954), Ukrainian politician
Mykola Koval (born 1952), Belorussian-born operatic baritone
Mykola Kovtalyuk (born 1995), Ukrainian football forward
Mykola Kremer, Ukrainian sprint canoeist who has competed since the late 2000s
Mykola Krotov (1898–1978), Ukrainian and Soviet football player and manager
Mykola Krupnyk (born 1972), Ukrainian biathlete
Mykola Kucher (born 1959), Ukrainian politician and entrepreneur
Mykola Kudrytsky (born 1962), Ukrainian professional football player
Mykola Kulinich (born 1953), Ukrainian diplomat
Mykola Kulish (1892–1937), Ukrainian prose writer, playwright, pedagogue, veteran of World War I, Red Army veteran
Mykola Kut (born 1952), Ukrainian artist
Mykola Kvasnyi (born 1995), Ukrainian football defender
Mykola Labovskyi (born 1983), Ukrainian middle-distance runner
Mykola Lahun, Ukrainian businessman, the majority shareholder and the Chairman of the Supervisory Board of JSC Delta Bank
Mykola Lebed (1909–1998), Ukrainian political activist, Ukrainian nationalist, and guerrilla fighter
Mykola Lebid (1936–2007), Ukrainian painter, graphic artist, designer, Honored Artist of Ukraine, and professor
Mykola Lemyk (1914–1941), Ukrainian political activist and leader of the Organization of Ukrainian Nationalists
Mykola Leontovych (1877–1921), Ukrainian composer, choral conductor, and teacher
Mykola Liubynsky (died 1938), Ukrainian politician and diplomat
Mykola Livytskyi (1907–1989), Ukrainian politician and journalist
Mykola Luchok (born 1974), Ukrainian prelate of the Latin Church of the Catholic Church, Titular Bishop of Giru Marcelli, Auxiliary bishop of Diocese of Mukachevo
Mykola Lukash (1919–1988), Ukrainian literary translator, theorist and lexicographer
Mykola Lysenko (1842–1912), Ukrainian musician and composer
Mykola Lytvyn, chief of the State Border Guard Service of Ukraine, General of the Army of Ukraine
Mykola Lytvyn (footballer) (born 1958), professional Ukrainian football coach and former player
Mykola Makhynia (1912–1990), Soviet and Ukrainian football player and coach
Mykola Malomuzh (born 1955), Ukrainian politician, General of the army of Ukraine
Mykola Marchak (1904–1938), Ukrainian and Soviet politician, acting Chairman of the Council of People's Commissars of the Ukrainian SSR
Mykola Marchenko (born 1943), sculptor, a representative of realism in Ukrainian art
Mykola Markevych (1804–1860), Russian Imperial historian, ethnographer, musician and poet of Ukrainian Cossack descent
Mykola Martynenko (born 1961), Ukrainian politician
Mykola Matviyenko (born 1996), Ukrainian football left defender
Mykola Medin (born 1972), Ukrainian professional football coach and a former player
Mykola Melnychenko (born 1966), bodyguard of Leonid Kuchma (President of Ukraine), an officer of the State Security Administration
Mykola Melnyk (1953–2013), Ukrainian pilot and liquidator hero renowned for his high-risk helicopter mission on the dangerously-radioactive Chernobyl Nuclear Power Plant
Mykola Mikhnovsky (1873–1924), Ukrainian political and social activist, lawyer, journalist, founder, ideologue and leader of a Ukrainian independence movement
Mykola Milchev (born 1967), Ukrainian sports shooter and 2000 Olympic skeet champion
Mykola Morozyuk (born 1988), Ukrainian footballer
Mykola Mozghovyi (1947–2010), Ukrainian and Soviet composer, producer, and songwriter
Mykola Musiyenko (born 1959), Ukrainian former triple jumper who represented the Soviet Union and later Ukraine
Mykola Musolitin (born 1999), professional Ukrainian football midfielder
Mykola Mykhailov (1903–1936), Ukrainian bandurist, composer and arranger
Mykola Nakonechnyi (born 1981), retired Ukrainian football player
Mykola Ovsianiko-Kulikovsky (1768–1846), purported author of a famous musical hoax Symphony No. 21, perpetrated by composer and violinist Mikhail Goldstein
Mykola Pavlenko (born 1979), Ukrainian football player
Mykola Pavlov (born 1954), former Ukrainian football defender, former head-coach of Illychivets Mariupol in the Ukrainian Premier League
Mykola Pavlyuk (born 1995), professional Ukrainian football defender
Mykola Pawluk (born 1956), television video editor over four decades
Mykola Pinchuk (born 1946), retired Ukrainian and Soviet football player
Mykola Plaviuk (1925–2012), Ukrainian social and political activist in emigration, who served as the last President of the Ukrainian People's Republic in exile
Mykola Polyakov, Ukrainian scientist and rector of Dnipropetovsk National University
Mykola Popovych (born 1971), Ukrainian cross-country skier
Mykola Porsh, political and civil activist of Ukraine, economist, member of the Russian Constituent Assembly
Mykola Prostorov (born 1994), Ukrainian male trampoline gymnast and member of the national team
Mykola Prystay (born 1954), retired Soviet football player and current Ukrainian coach
Mykola Prysyazhnyuk (born 1960), the former Minister of Agrarian Policy and Food of Ukraine
Mykola Puzderko (born 1990), Ukrainian freestyle skier, specializing in aerials
Mykola Pymonenko (1862–1912), Ukrainian painter
Mykola Redkin (born 1928), Ukrainian athlete
Mykola Riabchuk (born 1953), Ukrainian public intellectual, journalist, political analyst, literary critic, translator and writer
Mykola Riabovil (1883–1919), Ukrainian political figure in the Kuban
Mykola Rohozhynskyy, self-nominated candidate in the 2004 Ukrainian presidential election
Mykola Rudenko (1920–2004), Ukrainian poet, writer, philosopher, Soviet dissident, human rights activist, founder of the Ukrainian Helsinki Group
Mykola Savolaynen (born 1980), Ukrainian triple jumper
Mykola Selivon, Ukrainian jurist, judge, diplomat and former chairman of the Constitutional Court of Ukraine
Mykola Semena (born 1950), Ukrainian journalist who worked for Radio Free Europe/Radio Liberty,
Mykola Shaparenko (born 1998), Ukrainian professional football midfielder
Mykola Shapoval (1886–1948), military, public and political figure, Major General of the Ukrainian People's Army
Mykola Shevchenko, former Ukrainian football player, former head coach of Indian I-League side Churchill Brothers
Mykola Shmatko (born 1943), contemporary Ukrainian sculptor and painter
Mykola Shytyuk (1953–2018), Ukrainian academician, historian, doctor of historical sciences
Mykola Simkaylo (1952–2013), eparch of the Ukrainian Catholic Eparchy of Kolomyia – Chernivtsi in Ukraine since 2 June 2005 until his death
Mykola Skorodynskyi (1751–1805), Ukrainian Greek Catholic hierarch
Mykola Skoryk (born 1972), Ukrainian politician who was Chairman of the Odessa Regional State Administration
Mykola Skriabin (born 1978), Ukrainian alpine skier
Mykola Skrypnyk (1872–1933), Ukrainian Communist leader, proponent of the Ukrainian Republic's independence
Mykola Stakhovsky (1879–1948), Ukrainian diplomat, politician, medic
Mykola Stasyuk, Ukrainian political and public figure
Mykola Storozhenko (painter) (1928–2015), Ukrainian painter
Mykola Stsiborskyi (1897–1941), Ukrainian nationalist politician, chief theorist of the central leadership council of the Organization of Ukrainian Nationalists
Mykola Suk (born 1945), Ukrainian American pianist and Merited Artist of Ukraine
Mykola Sumtsov (1854–1922), Ukrainian ethnographer, folklorist, art historian, literary scholar, educator and museum expert
Mykola Szczerbak (1927–1998), Ukrainian zoologist and ecologist, a prolific herpetologist, a full professor and a Corresponding Member of the National Academy of Sciences of Ukraine
Mykola Temniuk (born 1992), Ukrainian footballer
Mykola Tomenko (born 1964), Ukrainian politician
Mykola Tomyn (born 1948), former Soviet/Ukrainian handball player who competed in the 1976 and 1980 Summer Olympics
Mykola Tsybulenko (1942–1998), Ukrainian major general
Mykola Tsygan (born 1984), Ukrainian football goalkeeper
Mykola Vasylenko (1866–1935), Ukrainian academician historian and law professor
Mykola Vechurko (born 1992), professional Ukrainian football midfielder
Mykola Velychkivsky (1889–1976), economist, professor, Ukrainian politician and statesman, chairman of the Ukrainian National Council
Mykola Vilinsky (born 1888), Ukrainian composer, professor at the Odessa and Kiev Conservatories
Mykola Volosyanko (1972–2012), Ukrainian professional footballer and assistant manager
Mykola Voronyi (1871–1938), Ukrainian writer, poet, actor, director, and political activist
Mykola Vynnychenko (born 1958), former Soviet Ukrainian race walker
Mykola Yankovsky (born 1944), former Ukrainian businessman who has influenced Ukraine's chemical production landscape and made it environmentally friendly
Mykola Yunakiv (1871–1931), Ukrainian general, military pedagogue
Mykola Yurchenko (born 1966), Soviet and Ukrainian professional footballer
Mykola Zaichenkov, Ukrainian sprint canoeist
Mykola Zaludyak (1941–2010), Ukrainian politician and the first secretary (mayor) of Kremenchuk city committee of Communist Party of Ukraine
Mykola Zerov (1890–1937), Ukrainian poet, translator, classical and literary scholar and critic
Mykola Zhabnyak (born 1979), Paralympian athlete from Ukraine competing mainly in category F37/38 throwing events
Mykola Zhovtyuk (born 1992), professional Ukrainian football defender
Mykola Zlochevsky (born 1966), Ukrainian oil and natural gas businessman, politician and a Ukrainian oligarch

See also
Mykolas
Makola (disambiguation)
Mycula
Mikkola (disambiguation)
Mäeküla (disambiguation)

Slavic masculine given names
Ukrainian masculine given names